César and Rosalie is a 1972  French romance film starring Yves Montand and Romy Schneider, directed by Claude Sautet.

Plot
In Paris the beautiful divorcée Rosalie spends time with César, a coarse but good-hearted scrap merchant. At a wedding she sees her first love David, a shy graphic artist. Despite the efforts of César to stifle the renewed relationship, David and Rosalie run away to Sète on the Mediterranean. Distraught at being abandoned, César tracks them down and offers Rosalie her family's old holiday home on the island of Noirmoutier in the Atlantic, which he has bought. She accepts and all her family come to spend the summer there, but she falls into depression. In an effort to rally her, César goes to find David and persuades him to join them. This well-intentioned ploy backfires because Rosalie then runs away. Left together, the two rivals become good friends. A year later they are enjoying lunch when a taxi draws up and out steps Rosalie.

Cast
 Yves Montand - César
 Romy Schneider - Rosalie
 Sami Frey - David
 Bernard Le Coq - Michel
 Eva Maria Meineke - Lucie Artigues
 Henri-Jacques Huet - Marcel
 Isabelle Huppert - Marite
 Gisela Hahn - Carla
 Betty Beckers - Madeleine
 Hervé Sand - Georges
 Jacques Dhéry - Henri Harrieu
 Pippo Merisi - Albert
 Carlo Nell - Jérôme
 Dimitri Petricenko - Simon

Reception
The film sold 2,577,865 tickets in France, and was the 11th most watched film of 1972.

Roger Ebert said it is "too pleasing a movie not to review", and remarked "it’s the sort of thing the French, with their appreciation for the awesome complexities of a simple thing like love, do especially well."  TV Guide called it an "intelligent and funny romance", and added "what makes the film... worth watching is the interplay among Montand, Schneider, and Frey." The New York Times compared it to "exposure to very good, even subtle, table manners—impressive but not too involving", and said the film "generally remains on the surface... like the type of slick magazine fiction to which it belongs."  Time Out was also skeptical, saying that the film "is saved from colour supplement chic only by sympathetic performances from Schneider and Montand."

See also
 Isabelle Huppert on screen and stage

References

External links 
 

1972 films
French romantic drama films
1970s French-language films
Films directed by Claude Sautet
1972 romantic drama films
Films with screenplays by Jean-Loup Dabadie
Films scored by Philippe Sarde
1970s French films